Gymnelia zelosa is a moth of the subfamily Arctiinae. It was described by Paul Dognin in 1899. It is found in Colombia.

References

Gymnelia
Moths described in 1899